Cheung Sha Wan Catholic Secondary School (abbr. CSWCSS) is one of Hong Kong's leading English boys' schools. It was established on 20 November 1970 by the Catholic Diocese of Hong Kong. The school is situated on Fuk Wing Street, Cheung Sha Wan, Hong Kong.

In 2017, the school ranked 73 among the top 100 schools in Hong Kong. It is one of the best schools in Sham Shui Po. Most Form 1 new students are in band 1.

Campus 
The campus is located at 533 Fuk Wing Street, Cheung Sha Wan, Kowloon, Hong Kong.

Student life

Sports
The school places strong emphasis on sports education, volleyball in particular. Being well known in sport area, the school has consecutively acquired the championship of boys' overall grades in Hong Kong Catholic Diocesan Secondary Schools Joint Athletics Meet 16 times from 1976 to 2010. The school has recaptured the boy overall champion of 21st Meet on 27 November 2013 with champions in Boy B and C grades and 1st runner-up in Boy A grade.

STEM education 
Being selected by the Government of Hong Kong to receive a funding of HK$7 million to promote STEM education, the school have been promoting such development over the past years through running the Enriched IT programme, and the formation of their Innovative Technology Society.

References 

Catholic secondary schools in Hong Kong
Educational institutions established in 1970
Cheung Sha Wan